Logging Lake is located in Glacier National Park, in the U. S. state of Montana. The Lower Logging Lake Snowshoe Cabin and Boathouse are two structures located near the southwestern end of Logging Lake, and are on the National Register of Historic Places. Logging Lake is a  hike from the Logging Lake Ranger Station.

Glacier View Dam, proposed in the 1940s, would have raised the surface of Logging Lake by as much as  while inundating lands to the west of the lake. The dam was never built.

See also
List of lakes in Flathead County, Montana (A-L)

References

Lakes of Glacier National Park (U.S.)
Lakes of Flathead County, Montana